

Current sporting seasons

Auto racing 2012

World Rally Championship

Basketball 2012

NBA
NCAA Division I men
NCAA Division I women
Euroleague
EuroLeague Women
Eurocup
EuroChallenge
ASEAN Basketball League
Australia
France
Germany
Greece
Israel
Italy
Philippines
Commissioner's Cup
Russia
Spain
Turkey

Cricket 2012

Australia:
Sheffield Shield
Ryobi One-Day Cup

Football (soccer) 2012

National teams competitions
2014 FIFA World Cup qualification
UEFA Women's Euro 2013 qualifying
International clubs competitions
UEFA (Europe) Champions League
UEFA Europa League
UEFA Women's Champions League
Copa Libertadores (South America)
CONCACAF (North & Central America) Champions League
OFC (Oceania) Champions League
Domestic (national) competitions
Australia
England
France
Germany
Iran
Italy
Portugal
Russia
Scotland
Spain

Ice hockey 2012

National Hockey League
Kontinental Hockey League
Czech Extraliga
Elitserien
Canadian Hockey League:
OHL, QMJHL, WHL
NCAA Division I men
NCAA Division I women

Rugby union 2012

Heineken Cup
Amlin Challenge Cup
Aviva Premiership
RaboDirect Pro12
LV= Cup
Top 14
Sevens World Series

Snooker 2012

Players Tour Championship

Tennis 2012

ATP World Tour
WTA Tour

Volleyball 2012

International clubs competitions
Men's CEV Champions League
Women's CEV Champions League

Winter sports

Alpine Skiing World Cup
Biathlon World Cup
Bobsleigh World Cup
Cross-Country Skiing World Cup
Freestyle Skiing World Cup
Luge World Cup
Nordic Combined World Cup
Short Track Speed Skating World Cup
Skeleton World Cup
Ski Jumping World Cup
Snowboard World Cup
Speed Skating World Cup

Days of the month

March 31, 2012 (Saturday)

Football (soccer)
OFC Women's Pre-Olympic Football Tournament Final Stage, first leg:  8–0 
UEFA Women's Euro 2013 qualifying:
Group 1:
 8–0 
 1–1 
 4–0 
Group 2:
 3–0 
 5–0 
 5–0 
Group 3:  0–3 
Group 4:  2–0 
Group 5:  0–1 
Group 6:  0–6 
Group 7:  2–5

March 30, 2012 (Friday)

Baseball
Nippon Professional Baseball season opening games:
Central League:
Chunichi Dragons 4, Hiroshima Toyo Carp 2
Hanshin Tigers 5, Yokohama DeNA BayStars 5 (F/10)
Tokyo Yakult Swallows 4, Yomiuri Giants 0
Pacific League:
Chiba Lotte Marines 5, Tohoku Rakuten Golden Eagles 3
Fukuoka SoftBank Hawks 3, Orix Buffaloes 1
Hokkaido Nippon-Ham Fighters 9, Saitama Seibu Lions 1

Basketball
Euroleague Quarterfinals Game 4 (teams in bold qualify for the Final Four):
Gescrap Bizkaia  71–73  CSKA Moscow. CSKA Moscow win series 3–1.
Olympiacos  76–69  Montepaschi Siena. Olympiacos win series 3–1.

March 29, 2012 (Thursday)

Baseball
Major League Baseball Japan Opening Series, Game 2 in Tokyo: Oakland Athletics 4, Seattle Mariners 1

Basketball
Euroleague Quarterfinals Game 4: Maccabi Tel Aviv  69–78  Panathinaikos

Football (soccer)
UEFA Europa League Quarter-finals, first leg:
AZ  2–1  Valencia
Schalke 04  2–4  Athletic Bilbao
Sporting CP  2–1  Metalist Kharkiv
Atlético Madrid  2–1  Hannover 96
Copa Libertadores Second Stage, matchday 4:
Group 4:
Boca Juniors  2–0  Arsenal
Zamora  0–1  Fluminense
AFC Olympic Qualifiers Playoff Round, matchday 3 in Hanoi, Vietnam:  2–0 
Oman qualify for the AFC–CAF Olympic play-off against  on April 23.

March 28, 2012 (Wednesday)

Baseball
Major League Baseball Japan Opening Series, Game 1 in Tokyo: Seattle Mariners 3, Oakland Athletics 1 (F/11)

Basketball
Euroleague Quarterfinals Game 3:
Gescrap Bizkaia  94–81  CSKA Moscow
Olympiacos  75–55  Montepaschi Siena

Football (soccer)
UEFA Champions League Quarter-finals, first leg:
Marseille  0–2  Bayern Munich
Milan  0–0  Barcelona
Copa Libertadores Second Stage:
Group 2: Olimpia  3–2  Flamengo
Group 3: Universidad Católica  2–1  Unión Española
Group 7: Defensor Sporting  1–0  Guadalajara
CONCACAF Champions League Semifinals, first leg:
Toronto FC  1–1  Santos Laguna
Monterrey  3–0  UNAM

March 27, 2012 (Tuesday)

Basketball
Euroleague Quarterfinals Game 3 (team in bold qualify for the Final Four):
Maccabi Tel Aviv  65–62  Panathinaikos
UNICS Kazan  56–67  FC Barcelona Regal. FC Barcelona Regal win series 3–0.

Football (soccer)
UEFA Champions League Quarter-finals, first leg:
APOEL  0–3  Real Madrid
Benfica  0–1  Chelsea
Copa Libertadores Second Stage:
Group 5: Nacional  1–0  Alianza Lima
Group 6: Deportivo Táchira  0–0  Nacional
Group 8: Universidad de Chile  2–1  Peñarol
AFC Olympic Qualifiers Playoff Round, matchday 2 in Hanoi, Vietnam:  2–1 
CONCACAF Men's Olympic Qualifying Tournament, group stage, matchday 3 (teams in bold advance to the semifinals):
Group B in Carson, California:
 2–0 
 1–0 
Standings: Mexico 9 points, Honduras 6, Panama, Trinidad and Tobago 1.

March 26, 2012 (Monday)

Football (soccer)
CONCACAF Men's Olympic Qualifying Tournament, group stage, matchday 3:
Group A in Nashville, Tennessee (teams in bold advance to the semifinals):
 1–1 
 3–3 
Standings: El Salvador, Canada 5 points, United States 4, Cuba 1.

March 25, 2012 (Sunday)

Auto racing
Formula One:
 in Sepang, Malaysia: (1) Fernando Alonso  (Ferrari) (2) Sergio Pérez  (Sauber–Ferrari) (3) Lewis Hamilton  (McLaren–Mercedes)

Boxing
Oceania Olympic Qualification Tournament:
Light flyweight: Billy Ward  def. Charlie Keama  21–19. Ward qualifies for the Olympics.
Flyweight: Jackson Woods  def. Kauko Raka  by RSC. Woods qualifies for the Olympics.
Bantamweight: Ibrahim Balla  def. Gage Brown  19–8. Balla qualifies for the Olympics.
Lightweight: Luke Jackson  def. Chad Milnes  18–5. Jackson qualifies for the Olympics.
Light welterweight: Jeff Horn  def. Hinoma Livai  by RSC. Horn qualifies for the Olympics.
Welterweight: Cameron Hammond  def. Bowen Morgan  19–8. Hammond qualifies for the Olympics.
Middleweight: Jesse Ross  def. Andrew Kometa  17–7. Ross qualifies for the Olympics.
Heavyweight: Jai Opetaia  def. David Light  15–10. Opetaia qualifies for the Olympics.
Super heavyweight: Johan Linde  def. Uaine Fa  by RSCH. Linde qualifies for the Olympics.

Field hockey
Women's Olympic Qualifying tournament in Kontich, Belgium:
Third place game:   5–1 
Final:   4–1  
Belgium qualify for the Olympics.

Football (soccer)
AFC Olympic Qualifiers Playoff Round, matchday 1 in Hanoi, Vietnam:  1–1 
CONCACAF Men's Olympic Qualifying Tournament, group stage, matchday 2:
Group B in Carson, California:
 1–1 
 3–0

Sumo
Haru basho (March grand tournament) in Osaka, Japan:
Hakuhō Shō defeats Kakuryū Rikisaburō in a playoff to win the tournament, and wins his 22nd makuuchi (top division) championship to tie former yokozuna Takanohana Kōji for 5th on the all-time list.
Despite losing in the playoff, Kakuryū achieves the de facto necessary number of 33 wins over the last three tournaments to be promoted to ōzeki.

March 24, 2012 (Saturday)

Football (soccer)
CONCACAF Men's Olympic Qualifying Tournament, group stage, matchday 2:
Group A in Nashville, Tennessee:
 0–4 
 0–2 
OFC Men's Pre-Olympic Tournament in Taupo, New Zealand:
Bronze medal match:  0–1  
Final:   0–1  
New Zealand qualify for the Olympics.
 Belgian Cup Final: Lokeren 1–0 Kortrijk
Lokeren win the Belgian Cup for the first time.

March 23, 2012 (Friday)

Basketball
Euroleague Quarterfinals Game 2:
CSKA Moscow  79–60  Gescrap Bizkaia
Montepaschi Siena  81–80  Olympiacos

Field hockey
Women's Olympic Qualifying tournament in Kontich, Belgium, day 5:
 5–4 
 1–1 
 1–1 
Standings: Belgium, Ireland 13 points, Spain, Russia 7, France 3, Mexico 0.

Football (soccer)
CONCACAF Men's Olympic Qualifying Tournament, group stage, matchday 1:
Group B in Carson, California:
 3–1 
 1–7

March 22, 2012 (Thursday)

Basketball
Euroleague Quarterfinals Game 2:
Panathinaikos  92–94 (OT)  Maccabi Tel Aviv
FC Barcelona Regal  66–63  UNICS Kazan
 Israeli Women's Cup Final: Maccabi Bnot Ashdod 63–50 Elektra Ramat HaSharon
Maccabi Bnot Ashdod win their first trophy, and the first ever major team sport title for a team from Ashdod.

Curling
World Women's Championship in Lethbridge, Alberta, Canada:
Draw 15:
Draw 16:
Draw 17:

Field hockey
Women's Olympic Qualifying tournament in Kontich, Belgium, day 4:
 5–1 
 3–2 
 0–4

Football (soccer)
CONCACAF Men's Olympic Qualifying Tournament, group stage, matchday 1:
Group A in Nashville, Tennessee:
 0–0 
 6–0 
UEFA Women's Champions League Quarterfinals, second leg (first leg score in parentheses): Rossiyanka  – (0–2)  Turbine Potsdam
Copa Libertadores Second Stage:
Group 1: Santos  2–0  Juan Aurich
Group 7: Deportivo Quito  1–0  Vélez Sársfield
Group 8: Atlético Nacional  2–2  Godoy Cruz

Snooker
Championship League Final group in Stock, England:

March 21, 2012 (Wednesday)

Basketball
Euroleague Quarterfinals Game 1:
CSKA Moscow  98–71  Gescrap Bizkaia
Montepaschi Siena  75–82  Olympiacos

Curling
World Women's Championship in Lethbridge, Alberta, Canada:
Draw 12:
Draw 13:
Draw 14:

Football (soccer)
OFC Men's Pre-Olympic Tournament in Taupo, New Zealand (teams in bold advance to the semifinals):
Group A:
 1–16 
 2–1 
Standings: Fiji 9 points, Vanuatu 6, Solomon Islands 3, American Samoa 0.
Group B:  0–10 
Standings: New Zealand 6 points,  3, Tonga 0.
UEFA Women's Champions League Quarterfinals, second leg (first leg scores in parentheses):
1. FFC Frankfurt  3–0 (0–1)  LdB Malmö. 1. FFC Frankfurt win 3–1 on aggregate.
Brøndby IF  0–4 (0–4)  Lyon. Lyon win 8–0 on aggregate.
Göteborg  1–0 (1–3)  Arsenal. Arsenal win 3–2 on aggregate.
Copa Libertadores Second Stage:
Group 1: The Strongest  1–1  Internacional
Group 5: Vasco da Gama  2–0  Libertad
Group 6: Corinthians  1–0  Cruz Azul
AFC Champions League group stage:
Group C:
Al-Nasr  2–1  Lekhwiya
Al-Ahli  1–1  Sepahan
Group D:
Persepolis  6–1  Al-Shabab
Al-Gharafa  3–3  Al-Hilal
Group G:
Central Coast Mariners  1–1  Nagoya Grampus
Seongnam Ilhwa Chunma  1–1  Tianjin Teda
Group H:
Kashiwa Reysol  5–1  Jeonbuk Hyundai Motors
Guangzhou Evergrande  1–2  Buriram United
AFC Cup group stage:
Group C:
VB  2–2  Al-Kuwait
Al-Ettifaq  0–0  Al-Ahed
Group D:
Salgaocar  2–2  Neftchi Farg'ona
Al-Wehdat  2–1  Al-Oruba
Group G:
Chonburi  1–0  Home United
Citizen  2–1  Yangon United
Group H:
Ayeyawady United  3–1  Kelantan
Navibank Sài Gòn  3–1  Arema

March 20, 2012 (Tuesday)

Basketball
Euroleague Quarterfinals Game 1:
Panathinaikos  93–73  Maccabi Tel Aviv
FC Barcelona Regal  78–66  UNICS Kazan

Curling
World Women's Championship in Lethbridge, Alberta, Canada:
Draw 9:
Draw 10:
Draw 11:

Field hockey
Women's Olympic Qualifying Tournament in Kontich, Belgium, matchday 3:
 0–5 
 3–2 
 1–0

Football (soccer)
AFC Champions League group stage Matchday 2:
Group A:
Esteghlal  0–0  Nasaf Qarshi
Al-Jazira  3–2  Al-Rayyan
Group B:
Pakhtakor  1–1  Bani Yas
Al-Arabi  1–3  Al-Ittihad
Group E:
Adelaide United  2–0  Gamba Osaka
Pohang Steelers  0–2  Bunyodkor
Group F:
FC Tokyo  2–2  Ulsan Hyundai
Beijing Guoan  1–1  Brisbane Roar
AFC Cup group stage Matchday 2:
Group A:
Al-Suwaiq  0–0  Al-Faisaly
Al-Ittihad  1–0  Al-Qadsia
Group B:
Al-Oruba  2–2  Arbil
Kazma  3–0  East Bengal
Group E:
Al-Zawra'a  5–0  Al-Tilal
Safa  0–2  Al-Shorta
Group F:
Terengganu  0–2  Kitchee
Tampines Rovers  0–0  Sông Lam Nghệ An
Copa Libertadores Second Stage:
Group 2: Emelec  0–2  Lanús
Group 3: Bolívar  2–1  Junior

Snooker
Championship League Group seven in Stock, England:

March 19, 2012 (Monday)

Curling
World Women's Championship in Lethbridge, Alberta, Canada:
Draw 6:
Draw 7:
Draw 8:

March 18, 2012 (Sunday)

Alpine skiing
World Cup Final in Schladming, Austria:
Men's Slalom:  André Myhrer   Felix Neureuther   Mario Matt 
Slalom standings: (1) Myhrer 644 points (2) Ivica Kostelić  610 (3) Marcel Hirscher  560
Myhrer wins his first World Cup title.
Overall standings: (1) Hirscher 1355 points (2) Beat Feuz  1330 (3) Aksel Lund Svindal  1131
Hirscher wins his first overall World Cup title.
Women's Giant Slalom:  Viktoria Rebensburg   Anna Fenninger   Federica Brignone 
Giant slalom standings: (1) Rebensburg 650 points (2) Lindsey Vonn  455 (3) Tessa Worley  446
Rebensburg wins her second giant slalom World Cup title.
Overall standings: (1) Vonn 1980 points (2) Tina Maze  1402 (3) Maria Höfl-Riesch  1227
Vonn wins her fourth overall World Cup title, and her 16th World Cup title.

Auto racing
Formula One:
Australian Grand Prix in Albert Park, Australia: (1) Jenson Button  (McLaren–Mercedes) (2) Sebastian Vettel  (Red Bull–Renault) (3) Lewis Hamilton  (McLaren-Mercedes)
Sprint Cup Series:
Food City 500 in Bristol, Tennessee (all USA): (1) Brad Keselowski (Dodge; Penske Racing) (2) Matt Kenseth (Ford; Roush Fenway Racing) (3) Martin Truex Jr. (Toyota; Michael Waltrip Racing)

Biathlon
World Cup 9 in Khanty-Mansiysk, Russia:
Men's 15 km Mass Start:
Women's 12.5 km Mass Start:

Cross-country skiing
World Cup in Falun, Sweden:
Men's 15 km Free Handicap Start:
Women's 10 km Free Handicap Start:

Curling
World Women's Championship in Lethbridge, Alberta, Canada:
Draw 3:
Draw 4:
Draw 5:

Field hockey
 Men's Olympic Qualifying Tournament 2 in Dublin, Ireland:
Third place game:   6–1 
Final:   3–2  
South Korea qualify for the Olympics.
Women's Olympic Qualifying Tournament in Kontich, Belgium, matchday 2:
 2–1 
 3–0 
 0–12

Football (soccer)
OFC Men's Pre-Olympic Tournament in Taupo, New Zealand:
Group A:
 1–7 
 0–1 
Group B:  3–0 
CAF Champions League Preliminary round, second leg (first leg score in parentheses): Athlético Olympic  4–1 (0–5)  AS Vita Club. AS Vita Club win 6–4 on aggregate.

Freestyle skiing
World Cup in Megève, France:
Men's Moguls:
Women's Moguls:

Golf
PGA Tour:
Transitions Championship in Palm Harbor, Florida:
European Tour:
Open de Andalucia de Golf in Andalusia, Spain:
LPGA Tour:
RR Donnelley LPGA Founders Cup in Phoenix, Arizona:
Champions Tour:
Toshiba Classic in Newport Beach, California:

Ski jumping
Men's World Cup in Planica, Slovenia:
HS 215 (Ski flying):

Snooker
Players Tour Championship Finals in Galway, Ireland:
Final: Stephen Lee  4–0 Neil Robertson

Tennis
ATP World Tour:
BNP Paribas Open in Indian Wells, California, United States:
Final: Roger Federer  def. John Isner  7–6(9–7), 6–3
Federer wins his third title of the year and 73rd of his career, his fourth win at Indian Wells, also winning in 2004, 2005, and 2006, and his 19th career Masters win, tying the record held by Rafael Nadal.
WTA Tour:
BNP Paribas Open in Indian Wells, California, United States:
Final: Victoria Azarenka  def. Maria Sharapova  6–2, 6–3
Azarenka wins her fourth title of the year and 12th of her career. She is now 23–0 for the year. It's her third career Premier Mandatory event and seventh Premier overall.

March 17, 2012 (Saturday)

Alpine skiing
World Cup Final in Schladming, Austria:
Men's Giant Slalom:  Marcel Hirscher  2:25.53  Hannes Reichelt  2:25.79  Marcel Mathis  2:26.08
Giant Slalom standings: (1) Hirscher 705 points (2) Ted Ligety  513 (3) Massimiliano Blardone  408
Hirscher wins his first Giant Slalom World Cup title.
Women's Slalom:  Michaela Kirchgasser  1:32.57  Veronika Zuzulová  1:32.69  Marlies Schild  1:33.08
Slalom standings: (1) Schild 760 points (2) Kirchgasser 452 (3) Tina Maze  413
Schild wins her fourth Slalom World Cup title.

Auto racing
Nationwide Series:
Ford EcoBoost 300 at Bristol, Tennessee:

Biathlon
World Cup 9 in Khanty-Mansiysk, Russia:
Men's 12.5 km Pursuit:
Women's 10 km Pursuit:

Cricket
South Africa in New Zealand:
2nd Test in Hamilton:  185 & 168;  253 & 103/1. South Africa win by 9 wickets.

Cross-country skiing
World Cup in Falun, Sweden:
Men's 15 km Classic Mass Start:  Dario Cologna  43:14.9  Eldar Rønning  43:15.3  Len Valjas  43:16.2
Women's 10 km Classic Mass Start:

Curling
World Women's Championship in Lethbridge, Alberta, Canada:
Draw 1:
 – 
 – 
 – 
 – 
Draw 2:
 – 
 – 
 – 
 –

Cycling
UCI World Tour:
Milan–San Remo:

Field hockey
Men's Olympic Qualifying Tournament in Dublin, Ireland, matchday 5:
 5–1 
 4–2 
 1–1 
Standings: Korea 13 points, Ireland 11, Malaysia 10, Russia 6, Chile 3, Ukraine 0.
Women's Olympic Qualifying Tournament in Kontich, Belgium, matchday 1:
 7–0 
 5–1 
 4–0

Freestyle skiing
World Cup in Myrkdalen-Voss, Norway:
Men's Aerials:
Women's Aerials:

Rugby union
Six Nations Championship Week 5:
 13–6  in Rome
 16–9  in Cardiff
 30–9  in London
Standings: Wales 10 points, England 8, Ireland, France 5, Italy 2, Scotland 0.
Wales win the Championship for the 25th time.

Ski jumping
Men's World Cup in Planica, Slovenia:
HS 215 Team (Ski flying):

Snowboarding
World Cup in Valmalenco, Italy:
Men's Giant Slalom:
Women's Giant Slalom:

March 16, 2012 (Friday)

Alpine skiing
World Cup Final in Schladming, Austria:
Team Event:

Biathlon
World Cup 9 in Khanty-Mansiysk, Russia:
Men's 10 km Sprint:  Martin Fourcade  26:40.2 (0+0)  Arnd Peiffer  26:45.5 (0+1)  Fredrik Lindström  26:46.9 (0+0)
Sprint standings: (1) Fourcade 423 points (2) Emil Hegle Svendsen  378 (3) Carl Johan Bergman  287
Fourcade wins his first Sprint World Cup title.
Women's 7.5 km Sprint:  Magdalena Neuner  22:11.5 (1+1)  Vita Semerenko  22:14.7 (0+0)  Darya Domracheva  22:27.7 (0+1)
Sprint standings: (1) Neuner 571 points (2) Domracheva 471 (3) Kaisa Mäkäräinen  401
Neuner wins her second consecutive, and third overall, Sprint World Cup title.

Cross-country skiing
World Cup in Falun, Sweden:
Men's 3.75 km Free Individual:  Alex Harvey  8:16.8  Dario Cologna  8:17.0  Devon Kershaw  8:19.9
Women's 2.5 km Free Individual:  Marit Bjørgen  6:54.4  Charlotte Kalla  7:00.6  Marthe Kristoffersen  7:05.8

Football (soccer)
OFC Men's Pre-Olympic Tournament in Taupo, New Zealand:
Group A:
 0–2 
 8–0 
Group B:  1–0

Horse racing
Cheltenham Gold Cup in Cheltenham, United Kingdom:  Synchronised (trainer: Jonjo O'Neill, jockey: Tony McCoy)  The Giant Bolster (trainer: David Bridgwater, jockey: Tom Scudamore)  Long Run (trainer: Nicky Henderson, jockey: Sam Waley-Cohen)

Ski jumping
Men's World Cup in Planica, Slovenia:
HS 215 (Ski flying):  Robert Kranjec  434.3 points  Simon Ammann  423.4  Martin Koch  418.6

Snowboarding
World Cup in Valmalenco, Italy:
Men's Snowboard Cross:  Konstantin Schad   Andrey Boldykov   Lluis Marin Tarroch 
Snowboard Cross Standings: (1) Pierre Vaultier  3852 points (2) Boldykov 2930 (3) Nate Holland  2340
Vaultier wins his third World Cup Snowboard Cross title.
Women's Snowboard Cross:  Jacqueline Hernandez   Nelly Moenne Loccoz   Zoe Gillings 
Snowboard Cross Standings: (1) Dominique Maltais  4200 points (2) Maëlle Ricker  3950 (3) Aleksandra Zhekova  3760
Maltais win her second consecutive World Cup Snowboard Cross title.

March 15, 2012 (Thursday)

Alpine skiing
World Cup Final in Schladming, Austria:
Men's Super-G:  Christof Innerhofer  1:21.24  Alexis Pinturault  1:21.26  Marcel Hirscher  1:21.30
Super-G standings: (1) Aksel Lund Svindal  413 points (2) Didier Cuche  400 (3) Beat Feuz  368
Svindal wins his third World Cup Super-G title.
Women's Super-G:  Viktoria Rebensburg  1:24.54  Julia Mancuso  1:24.72  Marion Rolland  1:24.75
Super-G standings: (1) Lindsey Vonn  453 (2) Mancuso 381 (3) Anna Fenninger  369
Vonn wins her fourth consecutive World Cup Super-G title.

Field hockey
Men's Olympic Qualifying Tournament in Dublin, Ireland, matchday 4:
 2–0 
 2–3 
 0–3

Football (soccer)
UEFA Europa League Round of 16 second leg (first leg scores in parentheses):
Hannover 96  4–0 (2–2)  Standard Liège. Hannover 96 win 6–2 on aggregate.
PSV Eindhoven  1–1 (2–4)  Valencia. Valencia win 5–3 on aggregate.
Udinese  2–1 (0–2)  AZ. AZ win 3–2 on aggregate.
Athletic Bilbao  2–1 (3–2)  Manchester United. Athletic Bilbao win 5–3 on aggregate.
Olympiacos  1–2 (1–0)  Metalist Kharkiv. 2–2 on aggregate; Metalist Kharkiv win on away goals.
Manchester City  3–2 (0–1)  Sporting CP. 3–3 on aggregate; Sporting CP win on away goals.
Schalke 04  4–1 (0–1)  Twente. Schalke 04 win 4–2 on aggregate.
Beşiktaş  0–3 (1–3)  Atlético Madrid. Atlético Madrid win 6–1 on aggregate.
UEFA Women's Champions League Quarterfinals first leg: LdB Malmö  1–0  1. FFC Frankfurt
Copa Libertadores Second Stage:
Group 1: Juan Aurich  1–3  Santos
Group 2: Flamengo  3–3  Olimpia
CONCACAF Champions League Quarterfinals second leg (first leg score in parentheses): UNAM  8–0 (1–2)  Isidro Metapán. UNAM win 9–2 on aggregate.
 Hazfi Cup Final: Esteghlal 0–0 (4–1 pen.) Shahin Bushehr
Esteghlal win the Cup for the sixth time.

March 14, 2012 (Wednesday)

Alpine skiing
World Cup Final in Schladming, Austria:
Men's Downhill:  Aksel Lund Svindal  1:46.82  Beat Feuz  1:47.38  Hannes Reichelt  1:47.48
Downhill standings: (1) Klaus Kröll  605 points (2) Feuz 598 (3) Didier Cuche  521
Kröll wins his first World Cup discipline title.
Women's Downhill:  Lindsey Vonn  1:46.56  Marion Rolland  1:47.48  Tina Maze  1:47.78
Downhill standings: (1) Vonn 690 points (2) Tina Weirather  400 (3) Elisabeth Görgl  384
Vonn wins her fifth successive World Cup downhill title.

Boxing
The British Boxing Board of Control withdraws Derek Chisora's boxing licence following a brawl with David Haye in Munich, Germany.

Cross-country skiing
World Cup Final in Stockholm, Sweden:
Men's Sprint Classic:  Eirik Brandsdal   Teodor Peterson   Len Valjas 
Sprint standings: (1) Peterson 617 points (2) Nikolay Morilov  494 (3) Brandsdal 483
Peterson wins his first discipline world title.
Women's Sprint Classic:  Marit Bjørgen   Julia Ivanova   Maiken Caspersen Falla 
Sprint standings: (1) Kikkan Randall  658 points (2) Falla 536 (3) Bjørgen 521
Randall wins her first discipline world title.

Football (soccer)
2012 Olympics Men's Asian Qualifiers Preliminary Round 3, Matchday 6 (teams in bold qualify for the Summer Olympics; teams in italics advance to the Playoff Round):
Group A:
 1–1 
 0–0 
Standings: South Korea 12 points, Oman 8, Qatar 7, Saudi Arabia 3.
Group B:
 2–3 
 0–0 
Standings: United Arab Emirates 14 points, Uzbekistan 8, Iraq 5, Australia 4.
Group C:
 3–0 
 2–0 
Standings: Japan 15 points, Syria 12, Bahrain 9, Malaysia 0.
UEFA Champions League Round of 16 second leg (first leg scores in parentheses):
Chelsea  4–1 (a.e.t.) (1–3)  Napoli. Chelsea win 5–4 on aggregate.
Real Madrid  4–1 (1–1)  CSKA Moscow. Real Madrid win 5–2 on aggregate.
UEFA Women's Champions League Quarterfinals first leg:
Arsenal  3–1  Göteborg
Turbine Potsdam  2–0  Rossiyanka
Lyon  4–0  Brøndby IF
Copa Libertadores Second Stage:
Group 4:
Arsenal  1–2  Boca Juniors
Fluminense  1–0  Zamora
Group 5: Libertad  1–1  Vasco da Gama
Group 6: Cruz Azul  0–0  Corinthians
CONCACAF Champions League Quarterfinals second leg (first leg scores in parentheses):
Santos Laguna  – (1–2) Seattle Sounders
Los Angeles Galaxy  – (2–2) Toronto FC

Snowboarding
World Cup in Valmalenco, Italy:
Men's Snowboard Cross:
Women's Snowboard Cross:

March 13, 2012 (Tuesday)

Cycling
UCI World Tour:
Tirreno–Adriatico:

Field hockey
Men's Olympic Qualifying Tournament in Dublin, Ireland, matchday 3:
 1–5 
 4–3 
 1–1

Football (soccer)
UEFA Champions League Round of 16 second leg (first leg scores in parentheses):
Bayern Munich  7–0 (0–1)  Basel. Bayern Munich win 7–1 on aggregate.
Internazionale  2–1 (0–1)  Marseille. 2–2 on aggregate; Marseille win on away goals.
Copa Libertadores Second Stage:
Group 1: Internacional  5–0  The Strongest
Group 2: Lanús  1–0  Emelec
Group 5: Alianza Lima  1–0  Nacional
Group 6: Nacional  3–2  Deportivo Táchira
CONCACAF Champions League Quarterfinals second leg (first leg scores in parentheses): Monterrey  4–1 (3–1)  Morelia. Monterrey win 7–2 on aggregate.

March 12, 2012 (Monday)

March 11, 2012 (Sunday)

Alpine skiing
Men's World Cup in Kranjska Gora, Slovenia:
Slalom:

Athletics
World Indoor Championships in Istanbul, Turkey:
Men's 800 metres:  Mohammed Aman  1:48.36  Jakub Holuša  1:48.62  Andrew Osagie  1:48.92
Men's 3000 metres:  Bernard Lagat  7:41.44  Augustine Kiprono Choge  7:41.77  Edwin Soi  7:41.78
Men's 60 metres hurdles:  Aries Merritt  7.44  Liu Xiang  7.49  Pascal Martinot-Lagarde  7.53
Men's 4 × 400 metres relay:   (Frankie Wright, Calvin Smith Jr., Manteo Mitchell, Gil Roberts) 3:03.94   (Conrad Williams, Nigel Levine, Michael Bingham, Richard Buck) 3:04.72   (Lalonde Gordon, Renny Quow, Jereem Richards, Jarrin Solomon) 3:06.85
Men's triple jump:  Will Claye  17.70 WL  Christian Taylor  17.63  Lyukman Adams  17.36
Men's high jump:  Dimitrios Chondrokoukis  2.33  Andrey Silnov  2.33  Ivan Ukhov  2.31
Women's 60 metres:  Veronica Campbell-Brown  7.01 WL  Murielle Ahouré  7.04  Tianna Madison  7.09
Women's 800 metres:  Pamela Jelimo  1:58.83 WL  Nataliia Lupu  1:59.67  Erica Moore  1:59.97
Women's 3000 metres:  Hellen Onsando Obiri  8:37.16  Meseret Defar  8:38.26  Gelete Burka  8:40.16
Women's 4 × 400 metres relay:   (Shana Cox, Nicola Sanders, Christine Ohuruogu, Perri Shakes-Drayton) 3:28.76 WL   (Leslie Cole, Natasha Hastings, Jernail Hayes, Sanya Richards-Ross) 3:28.79   (Yuliya Gushchina, Kseniya Ustalova, Marina Karnaushchenko, Aleksandra Fedoriva) 3:29.55
Women's long jump:  Brittney Reese  7.23 CR  Janay DeLoach  6.98  Shara Proctor  6.89
Women's pole vault:  Yelena Isinbayeva  4.80  Vanessa Boslak  4.70  Holly Bleasdale  4.70

Auto racing
Sprint Cup Series:
Kobalt Tools 400 in Las Vegas, Nevada:
World Rally Championship:
 Rally México in León:
World Touring Car Championship:
FIA WTCC Race of Italy in Monza, Italy:

Biathlon
World Championships in Ruhpolding, Germany:
Men's 15 km Mass Start:  Martin Fourcade  38:25.4 (0+1+1+0)  Björn Ferry  38:28.4 (0+0+0+0)  Fredrik Lindström  38:28.8 (0+1+1+0)
Fourcade wins his third title of the championships and fourth overall.
Women's 12.5 km Mass Start:  Tora Berger  35:41.6 (0+0+1+0)  Marie-Laure Brunet  35:49.7 (0+0+0+1)  Kaisa Mäkäräinen  35:54.3 (0+0+0+1)
Berger wins her third title of the championships and fourth overall.

Cricket
South Africa in New Zealand:
1st Test in Dunedin:  238 (68.2 overs) & 435/5d (140 overs);  273 (88.2 overs) & 137/2 (41 overs). Match drawn.

Cross-country skiing
World Cup in Oslo, Norway:
30 km Classic Mass Start women:

Curling
World Junior Championships in Östersund, Sweden:
Men:
Bronze Medal Game:  3–7  
Gold Medal Game:   10–4  
Women:
Bronze Medal Game:  4–7  
Gold Medal Game:   6–5

Cycling
UCI World Tour:
Paris–Nice:
UCI Women's Road World Cup:
Ronde van Drenthe:

Field hockey
Men's Olympic Qualifying Tournament in Dublin, Ireland, matchday 2:
 6–2 
 0–12 
 6–1

Football (soccer)
CONCACAF Under-20 Women's Championship in Panama City, Panama (teams in bold qualify for FIFA U-20 Women's World Cup):
Bronze medal match:  5–0 
Final:  2–1 
United States win the title for the third time.

Golf
World Golf Championships:
WGC-Cadillac Championship in Doral, Florida:
PGA Tour:
Puerto Rico Open in Río Grande, Puerto Rico:

Rugby union
Six Nations Championship Week 4:
 22–24  in Saint-Denis

Short track speed skating
World Championships in Shanghai, China:
Men overall:  Kwak Yoon-Gy  102 points  Noh Jin-Kyu  76  Charles Hamelin  52
Women overall:  Li Jianrou  60 points  Valérie Maltais  47  Arianna Fontana  44

Ski jumping
Men's World Cup in Oslo, Norway:
HS 134:

Speed skating
World Cup 7 in Berlin, Germany:

Wrestling
European Championships in Belgrade, Serbia:

March 10, 2012 (Saturday)

Alpine skiing
Men's World Cup in Kranjska Gora, Slovenia:
Giant slalom:
Women's World Cup in Åre, Sweden:
Slalom:

Athletics
World Indoor Championships in Istanbul, Turkey:
Men's 60 metres:  Justin Gatlin  6.46  Nesta Carter  6.54  Dwain Chambers  6.60
Men's 400 metres:  Nery Brenes  45.11 CR  Demetrius Pinder  45.34  Chris Brown  45.90
Men's 1500 metres:  Abdalaati Iguider  3:45.21  Ilham Tanui Özbilen  3:45.35  Mekonnen Gebremedhin  3:45.90
Men's long jump:  Mauro Vinícius da Silva  8.23  Henry Frayne  8.23  Aleksandr Menkov  8.22
Men's pole vault:  Renaud Lavillenie  5.95 WL  Björn Otto  5.80  Brad Walker  5.80
Men's heptathlon:  Ashton Eaton  6645 WR  Oleksiy Kasyanov  6071  Artem Lukyanenko  5969
Women's 400 metres:  Sanya Richards-Ross  50.79  Aleksandra Fedoriva  51.76  Natasha Hastings  51.82
Women's 1500 metres:  Genzebe Dibaba  4:05.78  Mariem Alaoui Selsouli  4:07.78  Aslı Çakır Alptekin  4:08.74
Women's 60 metres hurdles:  Sally Pearson  7.73 WL  Tiffany Porter  7.94  Alina Talay  7.97
Women's triple jump:  Yamilé Aldama  14.82  Olga Rypakova  14.63  Mabel Gay  14.29
Women's high jump:  Chaunté Lowe  1.98  Antonietta Di Martino , Anna Chicherova , Ebba Jungmark  1.95
Women's shot put:  Valerie Adams  20.54 AR  Nadzeya Ostapchuk  20.42  Michelle Carter  19.58

Auto racing
Nationwide Series:
Sam's Town 300 in Las Vegas, Nevada:

Biathlon
World Championships in Ruhpolding, Germany:
Women's 4 x 6 km Relay:   (Tina Bachmann, Magdalena Neuner, Miriam Gössner, Andrea Henkel) 1:09:33.0 (1+10)   (Marie Laure Brunet, Sophie Boilley, Anais Bescond, Marie Dorin Habert) 1:10:01.5 (0+7)   (Fanny Welle-Strand Horn, Elise Ringen, Synnøve Solemdal, Tora Berger) 1:10:12.5 (0+12)
Germany retain the world title, with the same team as the one that competed in 2011.
Bachmann and Gössner both win their second world title.
Neuner wins her second title of the championships and 12th title overall.
Henkel wins her eighth world title.

Cross-country skiing
World Cup in Oslo, Norway:
50 km Classic Mass Start men:

Field hockey
Men's Olympic Qualifying Tournament in Dublin, Ireland, matchday 1:
 5–1 
 6–1 
 8–2

Football (soccer)
CAF Champions League Preliminary round:
First leg: AS Vita Club  5–0  Atlético Olympic
Second leg (first leg score in parentheses): Liga Muçulmana  3–0 (2–0)  Mafunzo. Liga Muçulmana win 5–0 on aggregate.
CAF Confederation Cup Preliminary round, second leg (first leg score in parentheses): Gor Mahia  0–1 (0–3)  Ferroviário de Maputo. Ferroviário de Maputo win 4–0 on aggregate.

Freestyle skiing
World Cup in Åre, Sweden:
Men's Dual Moguls:
Women's Dual Moguls:
World Cup in Moscow, Russia:
Men's Aerials:
Women's Aerials:
World Cup in Grindelwald, Switzerland:
Men's Ski Cross:
Women's Ski Cross:

Nordic combined
World Cup in Oslo, Norway:
HS 134 / 10 km:

Rugby union
Six Nations Championship Week 4:
 –  in Cardiff
 –  in Dublin

Short track speed skating
World Championships in Shanghai, China:

Snowboarding
World Cup in La Molina, Spain:
Men's Giant Slalom:
Women's Giant Slalom:

Speed skating
World Cup 7 in Berlin, Germany:

Wrestling
European Championships in Belgrade, Serbia:

March 9, 2012 (Friday)

Alpine skiing
Women's World Cup in Åre, Sweden:
Giant slalom:

Athletics
World Indoor Championships in Istanbul, Turkey:
Men's shot put:  Ryan Whiting  22.00  David Storl  21.88  Tomasz Majewski  21.72
Women's pentathlon:  Nataliya Dobrynska  5013  Jessica Ennis  4965  Austra Skujytė  4802
Dobrynska wins her first indoor world title and sets a new world record.

Biathlon
World Championships in Ruhpolding, Germany:
Men's 4 x 7.5 km Relay:   (Ole Einar Bjørndalen, Rune Brattsveen, Tarjei Bø, Emil Hegle Svendsen) 1:17:26.8 (1+7)   (Jean-Guillaume Béatrix, Simon Fourcade, Alexis Bœuf, Martin Fourcade) 1:17:56.5 (0+10)   (Simon Schempp, Andreas Birnbacher, Michael Greis, Arnd Peiffer) 1:18:19.8 (0+10)
Norway win the world title for the third time in succession.
Bjørndalen wins his second title of the championships and 18th title overall.
Svendsen wins his second title of the championships and seventh title overall.
Bø wins his fourth world title.

Cricket
ICC Intercontinental Cup One-Day in Sharjah, United Arab Emirates:  205/9 (50 overs);  209/8 (49.5 overs). United Arab Emirates win by 2 wickets.

Football (soccer)
CONCACAF Under-20 Women's Championship in Panama City, Panama:
Semi-finals:
 4–0 
 0–6 
United States and Canada qualify for FIFA U-20 Women's World Cup.

Freestyle skiing
World Cup in Åre, Sweden:
Men's Moguls:
Women's Moguls:

Nordic combined
World Cup in Oslo, Norway:
HS 106 / 10 km:

Short track speed skating
World Championships in Shanghai, China:

Ski jumping
Women's World Cup in Oslo, Norway:
HS 106:

Speed skating
World Cup 7 in Berlin, Germany:

Wrestling
European Championships in Belgrade, Serbia:

March 8, 2012 (Thursday)

Cricket
Commonwealth Bank Series:
3rd Final in Adelaide:  231 (49.3 overs);  215 (48.5 overs). Australia win by 16 runs, win series 2–1.

Football (soccer)
UEFA Europa League Round of 16, first leg:
Metalist Kharkiv  0–1  Olympiacos
Sporting CP  1–0  Manchester City
Twente  1–0  Schalke 04
Atlético Madrid  3–1  Beşiktaş
Standard Liège  2–2  Hannover 96
Valencia  4–2  PSV Eindhoven
AZ  2–0  Udinese
Manchester United  2–3  Athletic Bilbao
Copa Libertadores Second Stage:
Group 2: Flamengo  1–0  Emelec
Group 3: Junior  0–1  Bolívar
Group 8: Godoy Cruz  4–4  Atlético Nacional
CONCACAF Champions League Quarterfinals, first leg: Isidro Metapán  2–1  UNAM

Ski jumping
Men's World Cup in Trondheim, Norway:
HS 140: (1) Daiki Ito  (2) Richard Freitag  (3) Simon Ammann

Wrestling
European Championships in Belgrade, Serbia:

March 7, 2012 (Wednesday)

Biathlon
World Championships in Ruhpolding, Germany:
Women's 20 km Individual:  Tora Berger  42:30.0 (1+0+0+0)  Marie-Laure Brunet  43:26.4 (0+0+0+1)  Helena Ekholm  43:41.4 (1+0+0+0)
Berger wins her second title of the championships and third overall.

Cricket
ICC Intercontinental Cup One-Day in Sharjah, United Arab Emirates:  167 (48.5 overs);  171/6 (47.5 overs). United Arab Emirates win by 4 wickets.

Football (soccer)
UEFA Champions League Round of 16 second leg (first leg scores in parentheses):
APOEL  1–0 (a.e.t.) (0–1)  Lyon. 1–1 on aggregate; APOEL win 4–3 on penalties.
Barcelona  7–1 (3–1)  Bayer Leverkusen. Barcelona win 10–2 on aggregate.
Lionel Messi becomes the first player to score five goals in a match, in the Champions League era.
Copa Libertadores Second Stage:
Group 1: Santos  3–1  Internacional
Group 4: Boca Juniors  1–2  Fluminense
Group 6: Corinthians  2–0  Nacional
Group 7: Deportivo Quito  3–0  Vélez Sársfield
AFC Champions League group stage, matchday 1:
Group A: Nasaf Qarshi  2–4  Al-Jazira
Group C:
Sepahan  1–0  Al-Nasr
Lekhwiya  1–0  Al-Ahli
Group D:
Al-Shabab  0–0  Al-Gharafa
Al-Hilal  1–1  Persepolis
Group G:
Nagoya Grampus  2–2  Seongnam Ilhwa Chunma
Tianjin Teda  0–0  Central Coast Mariners
Group H:
Jeonbuk Hyundai Motors  1–5  Guangzhou Evergrande
Buriram United  3–2  Kashiwa Reysol
AFC Cup group stage, matchday 1:
Group C:
Al-Kuwait  1–5  Al-Ettifaq
Al-Ahed  5–3  VB
Group D:
Neftchi Farg'ona  2–1  Al-Wehdat
Al-Oruba  1–0  Salgaocar
Group E: Al-Shorta  3–2  Al-Zawra'a
Group G:
Yangon United  1–1  Chonburi
Home United  3–1  Citizen
Group H:
Arema  1–1  Ayeyawady United
Kelantan  0–0  Navibank Sài Gòn
CONCACAF Champions League Quarterfinals, first leg:
Toronto FC  2–2  Los Angeles Galaxy
Seattle Sounders  2–1  Santos Laguna

March 6, 2012 (Tuesday)

Biathlon
World Championships in Ruhpolding, Germany:
Men's 20 km Individual:  Jakov Fak  46:48.2 (0+0+0+1)  Simon Fourcade  46:55.2 (0+0+1+0)  Jaroslav Soukup  47:00.5 (0+1+0+0)
Fak becomes the first Slovenian biathlete to win a world title.

Cricket
Commonwealth Bank Series:
2nd Final in Adelaide:  271/6 (50 Overs);  272/2 (44.2 overs). Sri Lanka win by 8 wickets.

Football (soccer)
CONCACAF Under-20 Women's Championship in Panama City, Panama (teams in bold advance to the semifinals):
Group B:
 5–2 
 0–6 
Standings: United States 9 points, Panama 6, Guatemala 3, Cuba 0.
UEFA Champions League Round of 16 second leg (first leg scores in parentheses):
Arsenal  3–0 (0–4)  Milan. Milan win 4–3 on aggregate.
Benfica  2–0 (2–3)  Zenit St. Petersburg. Benfica win 4–3 on aggregate.
Copa Libertadores Second Stage:
Group 3: Unión Española  1–1  Universidad Católica
Group 5: Vasco da Gama  3–2  Alianza Lima
Group 8: Peñarol  1–1  Universidad de Chile
AFC Champions League group stage Matchday 1:
Group A: Al-Rayyan  0–1  Esteghlal
Group B:
Bani Yas  2–0  Al-Arabi
Al-Ittihad  4–0  Pakhtakor
Group E:
Gamba Osaka  0–3  Pohang Steelers
Bunyodkor  1–2  Adelaide United
Group F:
Brisbane Roar  0–2  FC Tokyo
Ulsan Hyundai  2–1  Beijing Guoan
AFC Cup group stage Matchday 1:
Group A:
Al-Qadsia  2–0  Al-Suwaiq
Al-Faisaly  1–1  Al-Ittihad
Group B:
East Bengal  0–1  Al-Oruba
Arbil  1–1  Kazma
Group E: Al-Tilal  1–2  Safa
Group F:
Sông Lam Nghệ An  0–1  Terengganu
Kitchee  3–1  Tampines Rovers
CONCACAF Champions League Quarterfinals, first leg: Morelia  1–3  Monterrey
CAF Champions League preliminary round, second leg (first leg score in parentheses): Diables Noirs  0–1 (0–1)  AFAD Djékanou. AFAD Djékanou wins 2–0 on aggregate.

March 5, 2012 (Monday)

Football (soccer)
CONCACAF Under-20 Women's Championship in Panama City, Panama (teams in bold advance to the semifinals):
Group A:
 0–0 
 1–0 
Standings: Canada 9 points, Mexico 6, Jamaica, Haiti 1.

March 4, 2012 (Sunday)

Biathlon
World Championships in Ruhpolding, Germany:
Men's 12.5 km Pursuit:  Martin Fourcade  33:39.4 (1+1+0+2)  Carl Johan Bergman  33:44.6 (0+1+1+0)  Anton Shipulin  34:01.5 (1+0+0+0)
Fourcade retains his pursuit title, and wins his second title of the championships.
Women's 10 km Pursuit:  Darya Domracheva  29:39.6 (0+1+1+0)  Magdalena Neuner  30:04.7 (0+1+0+2)  Olga Vilukhina  30:55.0 (0+0+1+0)
Domracheva wins her first world title.

Cricket
Commonwealth Bank Series:
1st Final in Brisbane:  321/6 (50 Overs);  306 (49.2 Overs). Australia win by 15 runs.

Football (soccer)
CONCACAF Under-20 Women's Championship in Panama City, Panama:
Group B:
 0–6 
 3–1 
CAF Champions League preliminary round, second leg (first leg scores in parentheses):
Les Astres  2–1 (0–1)  DFC8. 2–2 on aggregate; DFC8 win on away goals.
Africa Sports  2–0 (2–3)  Missile. Africa Sports win 4–3 on aggregate.
Horoya AC  1–0 (0–0)  Ports Authority. Horoya AC win 1–0 on aggregate.
APR  1–0 (0–0)  Tusker. APR win 1–0 on aggregate.
Ethiopian Coffee  4–1 (0–1)  Coin Nord. Ethiopian Coffee win 4–2 on aggregate.
Tonnerre  1–0 (0–0)  ASGNN. Tonnerre win 1–0 on aggregate.
Lesotho Correctional Services  0–0 (0–3)  URA. URA win 3–0 on aggregate.
Dolphins  3–0 (3–0)  CD Elá Nguema. Dolphins win 6–0 on aggregate.
Berekum Chelsea  3–0 (2–0)  LISCR. Berekum Chelsea win 5–0 on aggregate.
Power Dynamos  3–0 (5–1)  Japan Actuel's. Power Dynamos win 8–1 on aggregate.
 CAF Confederation Cup preliminary round, second leg (first leg scores in parentheses):
Motor Action  0–2 (1–1)  Black Leopards. Black Leopards win 3–1 on aggregate.
Simba  2–1 (1–1)  Kiyovu Sports. Simba win 3–2 on aggregate.
AS Tempête Mocaf  2–2 (0–2)  AC Léopard. AC Léopard win 4–2 on aggregate.
Sahel SC  2–2 (0–2)  Renaissance FC. Renaissance FC win 4–2 on aggregate.
Casa Sport  1–0 (a.e.t.) (0–1)  GAMTEL. 1–1 on aggregate; GAMTEL win 4–3 on penalties.
TANA  2–0 (1–2)  Extension Gunners. TANA win 3–2 on aggregate.
Hwange  4–1 (3–0)  Jamhuri. Hwange win 7–1 on aggregate.

March 3, 2012 (Saturday)

Biathlon
World Championships in Ruhpolding, Germany:
Men's 10 km Sprint:  Martin Fourcade  24:18.6 (1+1)  Emil Hegle Svendsen  24:33.7 (1+1)  Carl Johan Bergman  24:36.3 (0+0)
Fourcade wins his first world sprint title and second title overall.
Women's 7.5 km Sprint (all 0+0):  Magdalena Neuner  21:07.0  Darya Domracheva  21:22.2  Vita Semerenko  21:44.6
Neuner wins her third world sprint title and eleventh title overall.

Football (soccer)
CONCACAF Under-20 Women's Championship in Panama City, Panama:
Group A:
 10–0 
 0–2 
CAF Champions League preliminary round, second leg (first leg scores in parentheses):
Zamalek  1–0 (1–1)  Young Africans. Zamalek win 2–1 on aggregate.
Recreativo do Libolo  1–1 (3–1)  Orlando Pirates. Recreativo do Libolo win 4–2 on aggregate.
US Ouakam  0–1 (a.e.t.) (1–0)  Brikama United. 1–1 on aggregate; Brikama United win 3–1 on penalties.
FC Platinum  4–0 (4–2)  Green Mamba. FC Platinum win 8–2 on aggregate.
CAF Confederation Cup preliminary round, second leg (first leg scores in parentheses):
Étoile Filante  2–0 (0–1)  Dragons. Étoine Filante win 2–1 on aggregate.
FC Kallon  2–0 (0–1)  Union Douala. FC Kallon win 2–1 on aggregate.
Royal Leopards  1–0 (0–0)  Red Arrows. Royal Leopards win 1–0 on aggregate.
Saint-George SA  4–0 (1–0)  AS Mangasport. Saint-George SA win 5–0 on aggregate.
Unisport Bafang  0–0 (1–0)  Séwé Sports. Unisport Bafang win 1–0 on aggregate.
Atlético Semu  0–2 (0–3)  LLB Académic. LLB Académic win 5–0 on aggregate.

Mixed martial arts
UFC on FX: Alves vs. Kampmann in Sydney, Australia:
Middleweight bout: Costas Philippou  def. Court McGee  via unanimous decision (29–28, 29–28, 29–28)
Flyweight bout: Demetrious Johnson  and Ian McCall  fought to a majority draw (29–28, 29–29, 28–28)
Flyweight bout: Joseph Benavidez  def. Yasuhiro Urushitani  via TKO (punches)
Welterweight bout: Martin Kampmann  def. Thiago Alves  via submission (guillotine choke)
Strikeforce: Tate vs. Rousey in Columbus, Ohio, United States (USA unless stated):
Middleweight bout: Ronaldo Souza  def. Bristol Marunde via submission (arm-triangle choke)
Middleweight bout: Lumumba Sayers def. Scott Smith via submission (guillotine choke)
Welterweight bout: Kazuo Misaki  def. Paul Daley  via split decision (30–27, 28–29, 29–28)
Lightweight bout: Josh Thomson def. K. J. Noons via unanimous decision (29–28, 29–28, 29–28)
Women's Bantamweight Championship bout: Ronda Rousey def. Miesha Tate (c) via submission (armbar)

March 2, 2012 (Friday)

Equestrianism
Show jumping – Nations Cup Promotional League:
Nations Cup of the United States in Wellington, Florida:   (Jörg Oppermann, David Will, Johannes Ehning, Meredith Michaels-Beerbaum)   (Shane Sweetnam, Richie Moloney, Darragh Kerins, Cian O'Connor)   (Ian Millar, Tiffany Foster, Yann Candele, Eric Lamaze)

Football (soccer)
CONCACAF Under-20 Women's Championship in Panama City, Panama:
Group B:
 6–0 
 2–1 
CAF Champions League preliminary round, second leg (first leg scores in parentheses):
ASO Chlef  4–1 (0–0)  ASFA Yennenga. ASO Chlef win 4–1 on aggregate.
JSM Béjaïa  3–1 (0–0)  Foullah Edifice. JSM Béjaïa win 3–1 on aggregate.

March 1, 2012 (Thursday)

Basketball
Euroleague Top 16 matchday 6 (teams in bold advance to the quarterfinals):
Group E:
Anadolu Efes  65–82  CSKA Moscow
Olympiacos  88–81  Galatasaray Medical Park
Standings: CSKA Moscow 5–1, Olympiacos, Galatasaray Medical Park 3–3, Anadolu Efes 1–5.
Group F:
Unicaja  55–59  Gescrap Bizkaia
Montepaschi Siena  90–102  Real Madrid
Standings: Montepaschi Siena, Gescrap Bizkaia, Real Madrid 4–2, Unicaja 0–6.

Biathlon
World Championships in Ruhpolding, Germany:
2 x 6 km + 2 x 7.5 km Mixed Relay:   (Tora Berger, Synnøve Solemdal, Ole Einar Bjørndalen, Emil Hegle Svendsen) 1:12:29.3 (1+11)   (Andreja Mali, Teja Gregorin, Klemen Bauer, Jakov Fak) 1:12:49.5 (0+7)   (Andrea Henkel, Magdalena Neuner, Andreas Birnbacher, Arnd Peiffer) 1:13:02.1 (1+10)

Football (soccer)
CONCACAF Under-20 Women's Championship in Panama City, Panama:
Group A:
 5–0 
 3–1

References

III
March 2012 sports events